Hydrogenophaga aquatica is a Gram-negative, rod-shaped and aerobic bacterium from the genus of Hydrogenophaga which has been isolated from a hot spring.

References

External links
Type strain of Hydrogenophaga aquatica at BacDive -  the Bacterial Diversity Metadatabase

Comamonadaceae
Bacteria described in 2017